We Have Had Enough! is an agrarian political party in Slovakia. It was formed following protests by farmers in 2018 and 2019 surrounding the allocation of EU farm subsidies.

History 
Under the EU's Common Agricultural Policy, farmers in the EU are given subsidies in order to supplant their income and allow farmers "to make a reasonable living". According to the law in Slovakia, anyone who farms on the land can claim subsidies, even if they do not own the land itself. These laws meant that fraud could be committed quite easily. Journalist Ján Kuciak was going to publish an article alleging that several million Euros in subsidies had been lost due to fraud, but he was murdered on 26 February 2018.

Following Kuciak's murder, several large-scale anti-government protests were held. Slovakian farmers played an important role, demanding more transparent rules for the distribution of EU subsidies. The protests continued into 2019, and in August of that year František Oravec announced the founding of a new party, named after a slogan used by the protesting farmers.

The first election the party contested was the 2020 parliamentary election. They ran a total of 71 candidates, with party leader František Oravec receiving the most (4,082 votes). The party received a total of 0.32%, and did not win any seats in the National Council.

Ideology 
Having been founded by farmers, the party focuses mainly on agricultural issues. They call for self-sufficiency of food products, reforming the way EU farming grants are awarded, and restrictions on the export of timber in order to protect Slovakia's forests. In addition, they would encourage the establishment of regional farming companies and put in place more financial assistance for new farmers. Outside of agriculture, the party pledges to introduce new employment programmes, reduce taxation of businesses and improve Slovakia's less developed regions. The party also pledged to tailor their campaigns to specific regions of Slovakia, in order to "bring the strong voice of the regions to the National Council".

Electoral results

National Council

References 

Political parties in Slovakia
Agrarian parties